Kiri Territory is an administrative region of Mai-Ndombe Province, Democratic Republic of the Congo. The headquarters is the town of Kiri.

Location

Kiri territory has sandy clay soils, supporting food crops that include cassava, maize, banana, peanut, yams, sweet potatoes, sugarcane, rice, beans, vegetables, robusta coffee, cocoa and palm.
Most of the land is covered with rain forest.
The southern boundary is defined by the Lokoro River, which flows from the southeast, entering Lake Mai-Ndombe at the westernmost point of the territory. 
Kiri Territory is divided into the Beronge, Lutoy and Pendjwa sectors.

Economy

The Kiri General Hospital was rehabilitated in 1983, and a farmers cooperative was established in 1995.
Trade was mostly with Kinshasa via the neighboring territory of Inongo to the west, handled by a cartel of traders who controlled prices. 
Local products such as manioc or fish were exchanged for manufactured goods such as hammocks or machetes.

As of 2004 the territory lacked electricity and drinking water supplies, and had no telephone, radio or television service.
It does have an airport (Basango Mboliasa Airport) in good condition that is used for occasional unscheduled flights.

References

Sources

Territories of Mai-Ndombe Province